Hi Fi is the fourth studio album by Hugh Cornwell, released on 2 October 2000 by Koch Entertainment.

It is produced by Laurie Latham, who also worked on Cornwell's previous album Guilty (1997). All instrumentation is by Cornwell with appearances from Justin Chapman (drums), Michelle Marti (bass) and Mike Polson (guitar) from his touring band, a string quartet, and harmonica player John Dominic (ex-the Bo Street Runners, Deborah Bonham Band).

In 2001, the album was released in the US (Koch) and Europe (Edel) under the same title but with different artwork, an additional version of "Gingerbread Girl" and two live tracks.

A remixed and remastered vinyl edition of Hi Fi was released by Cornwell's own HIS Records in 2021. It was released in a limited edition of 500 copies, with new cover art work, and with the original track listing.

Critical reception

AllMusic's Mark Deming found the album "pleasingly tuneful, with strong pop melodies," and a "winning psychedelic undertow" on certain tracks. He felt it "ranks with the most confident and accessible work of [Cornwell's] career," with Cornwell's vocals and songwriting being "in fine shape", and Laurie Latham's production serving the material well.

Track listing

US/European 2001 release
Duration of some tracks differ from the UK version.

 Track 2: additional production and mixing by the Black Dog at Black Dog Towers, London.
 Tracks 11 and 12: solo acoustic live recordings; no date or location is given.

Personnel
Credits adapted from the album liner notes.

Musicians
Hugh Cornwell – vocals, instrumentation
Justin Chapman – drums (1, 3-8)
Michelle Marti – bass (1, 4-8)
Mike Polson – additional guitar (1, 5, 7, 8)
Sumyungstrings: 
Gita Langley – violin
Jesse Murphy – violin
Rachel Helleur – cello
Una Palliser – viola (8, 9)
John Dominic – harmonica (7, 10)

Technical
Laurie Latham – producer, engineer
Jon Astley – mastering
AL at Spot On Design – design, artwork
Gary Bryan – cover photography

2001 US/European release
Steve "Hotdog" Ash – engineer (2)
Jeff Chenault – art direction, design

2021 vinyl reissue
Hugh Cornwell – remixing, artwork
Phil Andrews – remixing
Barry Grint – remastering
Nick Stone – artwork
Andrew J. Davies – photography

References

2000 albums
Hugh Cornwell albums
Albums produced by Laurie Latham